John Alcock was Dean of Ferns from 1747 until 1769. His father, Alexander Alcock, was Dean of Lismore from 1725 until 1747.

Notes

Alumni of Trinity College Dublin
Deans of Ferns
Year of birth missing
Year of death missing